Palmer Cortlandt is a fictional character on the long-running ABC soap opera All My Children, played by James Mitchell from 1979 to 2010. A major character until 2002, when health issues forced him to reduce his work load, Mitchell continued to appear regularly on the show through May 2007. Mitchell appeared in a handful of episodes throughout 2008, last appearing on September 19, 2008. Mitchell retired from acting in 2009 but made a final on air cameo appearance as Palmer Cortlandt on January 5, 2010 to celebrate the show's 40th anniversary.

A little over 2 weeks later, on January 22, Mitchell died at the age of 89. The show aired a tribute to Palmer on April 20, 2010, featuring never-before-seen footage of Mitchell shot for the 40th anniversary episode. Mitchell improvised dialogue about Palmer's dobermans and the women he loved and head writer Lorraine Broderick used it, alongside numerous flashbacks, to frame the special memorial episode.

James Mitchell earned seven Daytime Emmy nominations, all in the Lead Actor in a Drama Series category, for his portrayal of Palmer Cortlandt.

In 2010, Palmer Cortlandt was ranked #11 on ABC Soaps in Depths list of Soaps' 50 Naughtiest Bad Guys.

Storylines
Born in Pigeon Hollow, West Virginia, as Pete Cooney, he wooed Lottie Chandler, fathered her son Ross, and abandoned her. He changed his name to Palmer Cortlandt and made a success of himself. Palmer fell in love with Daisy, the housekeeper's daughter. They had a child together, Nina, and for years, Palmer had his daughter believing that her mother had died, while she was in fact alive. He had kicked her out when he had discovered that she was having an affair.

Being the overprotective father that he was, he tried to ruin his daughter's relationship with Dr. Cliff Warner in many diabolical ways. He enlisted the help of nurse, Sybil Thorne, who seduced Cliff and became pregnant with their son Bobby. He tried to convince diabetic Nina that she was going blind due to her illness and shouldn't burden Cliff with an invalid wife. He hired sexy Steve Jacobi to work with and seduce Nina at Cortlandt Electronics. Eventually true love won out (after four marital attempts) and the happy Warners left Pine Valley together.

When his first wife Daisy Cortlandt came back from the dead, Palmer tried to kill her by threatening her with dobermans. It was revealed that his stern housekeeper Myra Murdoch was actually Daisy's widowed mother, and thus Nina's grandmother. Myra was the one person in the Cortlandt household who was not afraid to stand up to Palmer, basically blackmailing him with secrets of the past to remain in his employ so she could help raise Nina.

Shortly after arriving in Pine Valley, Palmer became interested in and married ex-hooker Donna Beck, thinking that he could make her into the worldly woman that he longed to have on his arm. While enjoying a skiing trip to Switzerland Palmer and Donna ran into her ex-husband, Chuck Tyler and his new girlfriend, Melanie. As they were all skiing together an avalanche surprised them and Chuck and Donna found themselves trapped in a cave. Convinced that they would never be rescued, they made love. They were rescued the next day, and upon returning to Pine Valley Donna discovered that she was pregnant. She was thrilled but Palmer was suspicious because he was sterile due to a polo accident years earlier. Not wanting to arouse suspicions, Palmer played out the role of doting husband and father. Soon, however, it was revealed that the baby was indeed Chuck's, and Palmer & Donna separated.

After an unsuccessful second try with Nina's mother, Daisy, Palmer became interested in his son Ross's ex-wife, Cynthia Preston. Cynthia came to town looking for a meal ticket and dug her claws deep into Palmer. He was thrilled with the attention of this attractive young brunette and genuinely developed a bond to her teen-age son, Andrew, who Palmer envisioned as the heir to Cortlandt Electronics. However Cynthia fell into an affair with Ross and thus out of Palmer's good graces, and Andrew was sent to jail for participating in the death of Alexander Hunter.

When Palmer was shot by a thug hired by Adam Chandler, he hired nurse Natalie Marlowe to look after him. Palmer and Natalie fell in love and planned to marry, but Palmer's son Ross also had eyes for Natalie, and they began an affair. Stressed that Palmer would find out, Ross raped Natalie, who was then thrown out by Palmer. However Palmer's feelings for Natalie remained, and he wasn't willing to let her go. When Natalie was attacked by Silver Kane and accidentally shot her, Palmer hid the body in a pond on his property and blackmailed Natalie into reconciling with him. Next, when Natalie started a relationship with her lifelong heartthrob Jeremy Hunter, Palmer brought his ex-lover Marisa Rampal to town to break them up.

Never being quite satisfied with his family members´ choices in the love department, Palmer set out to destroy his naive niece Dixie Cooney's happiness with Tad Martin. Palmer paid Tad's mother Opal Cortlandt to help him break them up, and they succeeded. But Palmer had not planned on falling in love with his partner in crime in the process and with his ex-wife Daisy playing matchmaker, "PC" and Opal married in November 1990. On Christmas Day 1992, Opal and Palmer welcomed the birth of their son, Peter.

Government agent Mike Roy and partner, Adrian Sword, arrived in town to find stolen Nazi paintings. Palmer, after much posturing, admitted that he possessed the paintings and plea-bargained his way out of charges. The definitive end to Palmer and Opal's marriage came when Palmer had to decide between relinquishing the paintings and staying with Opal or faking his death and escaping with the artwork. In the end he lost both. Irritated with Opal's friendship with Adrian and her aid in catching him, Palmer sought revenge on Opal and made her reveal that Adrian was her son from an interracial affair. This blew Adrian's FBI cover and his mind. Adrian forced Palmer into signing a divorce decree that was very generous to Opal.

Palmer became taken by Pine Valley socialite, Vanessa Bennett, the mother of the nefarious Dr. David Hayward. They were married at sea while on vacation. Palmer admitted to Erica that he didn't really love Vanessa, but said that having an attractive woman on his arm is never a bad thing. Shortly after their marriage, Vanessa was almost divorced by Palmer when he found out that she was borrowing large sums of money to help a much younger man. Palmer believed that this young man, Leo du Pres, was Vanessa's lover. He had Leo kidnapped and set up a plot that would make it look like Leo had killed Vanessa in a jealous rage. When it came time for the shooting, Vanessa revealed that Leo was her son, not her lover. Palmer jumped in front of Vanessa and took the bullet. Vanessa learned that Palmer had plotted to kill her and used the shooting as leverage for months.

Vanessa's parenting skills came under fire when she reverted to her old, adulterous ways. Vanessa found her way into the bed of a young, shady character named Paolo Caselli. The two were not strangers; they'd apparently had an affair several years prior in Europe. Things got complicated when Paolo threatened to expose Vanessa's affair to Palmer. Leo was roped in when he hired Paolo to seduce Marian Chandler at Adam's request; the hope was that Stuart would ditch Marian if she had an affair with Paolo. Paolo ended up dead - and Leo was arrested because he was found hovering over Paolo's dead body. It turned out that Vanessa had accidentally killed Paolo by slipping too much of a powerful sedative into his wine. That and a high level of cocaine already in Paolo's system did him in. Vanessa never spoke up to defend her son because she feared that it would mean the end of her free ride with Palmer. Vanessa was set up, thanks to some help from David, to confess the truth — David slipped her a medication that made her think she was having a heart attack. The charges against Leo were subsequently dropped after Palmer hired someone to "lose" the evidence in the case, though no one ever spoke publicly of what Vanessa had done. Palmer used Vanessa's involvement against her, just as she had used his murder plot against him.

Palmer and Vanessa once again became cozy when Palmer learned that Vanessa had been blackmailing Arlene Vaughan over her involvement in nearly killing Stuart Chandler. Palmer loved it because Arlene's money was Adam's money — and Palmer loved sticking it to Adam. After Vanessa confessed to another affair—with her chauffeur, Larry—Palmer kicked her out of their room at The Valley Inn and sought a divorce. Vanessa was revealed to be the drug lord Proteus and supposedly perished with son Leo when they fell over a waterfall while struggling for her gun.

Palmer's attention then turned back to Opal. When he discovered that Opal had a new admirer, musician Hank Pelham, he was jealous of this new relationship. Using his influence, Palmer got Hank a job touring with a band, thus eliminating the competition since Hank had to leave Pine Valley.

Palmer was happy to see his grandson Bobby back in town, until he realized that Bobby had never really grown up. Bobby bilked money out of Edmund Grey before leaving town, without a goodbye to Palmer. A few months later, he was shocked when newcomer Diana Cole claimed to be his supposedly deceased niece, Dixie. He believed what she was saying and was devastated when it turned out that she was lying. It was much harder for him to accept when the real Dixie turned up alive and well.

Palmer relocated to Switzerland in August 2008 and in March 2009, it was revealed Palmer invested with someone who swindled him out of all of his money, leaving him, Pete, and Opal broke. Palmer was unable to be reached when Opal tried to contact him regarding what had happened to their money. Palmer quietly returned to Pine Valley in April 2010 and he planned to surprise Opal. Before he had a chance to see her, he suffered a heart attack and died in his hotel room.

Jackson Montgomery notified Palmer's family and friends that he did not want a formal memorial service held. Instead, an informal gathering was held at Tad Martin's home and fried chicken was served to commemorate Palmer's time working at the Chicken Shack and as a reminder of how he had turned the fast-food restaurant into a million dollar business. Daisy and Nina returned to Pine Valley and joined the others in reminiscing about their time with Palmer. After the memorial ended, everyone went home and lit a candle at midnight and said a private farewell to Palmer. He was welcomed into the white light by a vision of Dixie.

References

All My Children characters
Television characters introduced in 1979
Fictional characters from West Virginia
Fictional World War II veterans
Fictional businesspeople
Male villains
Male characters in television
Fictional business executives